Babka is a sweet braided bread or cake of Ashkenazi Jewish origin, filled with a variety of sweet or savory fillings.

Babka may also refer to:

 Baba (cake), or babka, a type of Easter bread popular in Eastern Europe often containing raisins
 Potato babka, a savoury Belarusian dish made from potato
 Babka (fish), a genus of fish, of which the sole member is the racer goby
 Babka (river), a river in Russia
 Babka (surname)

See also 
 General Babka (disambiguation)